HMS Parthian was the lead boat of the six Royal Navy s, all launched in 1929. The submarine was sunk in 1943 during the Second World War. The submarine was nicknamed Peanut, from the identity letters PN painted on the fin.

Service history
Parthian spent most of her Second World War service in the Mediterranean. On the outbreak of the war, she was on the China Station, but was transferred to Alexandria in May 1940. She sank the  near Tobruk on 20 June 1940. By the end of the year she had been attached to the 8th Submarine Flotilla based at Malta.

Parthian underwent a refit in the United States from late 1941 until March 1942 before returning to the Mediterranean, where she carried out supply operations between July and October to Malta carrying aviation fuel and ammunition. To increase her cargo capacity, one of the batteries was removed and no spare torpedoes were carried. In May 1943 the submarine sank a number of Italian sailing vessels in the Aegean Sea.

The submarine left Malta on 22 July 1943 for a patrol in the southern Adriatic. She was diverted to a patrol area off Otranto on 26 July, and diverted again on 28 July. The submarine was signalled on 6 August to leave the patrol area but the signal was not acknowledged. Parthian failed to arrive at Beirut, where she was due on 11 August. It is likely that she was sunk by a naval mine near Brindisi.

One crewmember lost with Parthian was Timothy Walker, the son of Captain Frederic John "Johnny" Walker, a leading U-boat hunter.

Notes

References

External links
 

Parthian-class submarines
Ships built in Chatham
1929 ships
World War II submarines of the United Kingdom
Lost submarines of the United Kingdom
World War II shipwrecks in the Mediterranean Sea
Maritime incidents in July 1943
Ships sunk by mines
Ships lost with all hands